Ian Craft (11 July 1937 – 3 June 2019) was a British physician and pioneer of fertility treatment. He produced the first test-tube twins and the first triplets.

Craft died on 3 June 2019, aged 81.

References

External links 

1937 births
2019 deaths
20th-century British medical doctors